Geography of Washington may refer to:

 Geography of Washington (state)
 Geography of Washington, D.C.